The chestnut-vented conebill (Conirostrum speciosum) is a species of bird in the family Thraupidae.
It is found in Argentina, Brazil, Bolivia, Colombia, Ecuador, French Guiana, Guyana, Paraguay, Peru, Suriname, and Venezuela.
Its natural habitats are subtropical or tropical moist lowland forests and heavily degraded former forest.

Gallery

References

chestnut-vented conebill
Birds of South America
chestnut-vented conebill
Taxonomy articles created by Polbot